The Academia Puertorriqueña de la Lengua Española (Spanish for Puerto Rican Academy of the Spanish Language) is an association of academics and experts on the use of the Spanish language in Puerto Rico.
It was founded in San Juan on January 28, 1955. It is a member of the Association of Spanish Language Academies.

The association works with the Royal Spanish Academy to add new words to the Spanish lexicon. In 2017, the academy was instrumental in adding the word "reguetón" to the official Spanish dictionary.

The academy put together a website with Puerto Rican vocabulary which can be searched by themes.

References

External links
  Official Website

Spanish language academies
Puerto Rican culture
Organizations established in 1955
1955 establishments in Puerto Rico